Léon Pierre Nijs (4 January 1890 – 12 June 1939) was a Belgian water polo player who competed in the 1912 Summer Olympics and in the 1920 Summer Olympics. He was part of the Belgian team and was able to win a silver and a bronze medal. He was born, and died, in Antwerp.

See also
 List of Olympic medalists in water polo (men)

References

External links
 

1890 births
1939 deaths
Belgian male water polo players
Water polo players at the 1912 Summer Olympics
Water polo players at the 1920 Summer Olympics
Olympic water polo players of Belgium
Olympic silver medalists for Belgium
Olympic bronze medalists for Belgium
Olympic medalists in water polo
Medalists at the 1920 Summer Olympics
Medalists at the 1912 Summer Olympics
20th-century Belgian people